Danielle Lynn Borgman (born April 25, 1980) is an American former professional soccer defender. She played professionally for the San Jose CyberRays. She also played for the United States women's national soccer team in the summer of 2000 as a member of the under-21 team and received a gold medal. She was ranked as one of the nation's fasted players.

Career
She previously played at the college level for the University of North Carolina Tar Heels. She started 52 games for them and was a first team All-American choice as a sophomore.

In her club soccer years, she played for the Hammer Football Club in Cincinnati, Ohio and played as a forward and midfielder. She became captain in 1996. In the same year she was named to the United States under-16 national team during her first year playing in the Olympic Development Program. In 1997, she was named to the All-Star Team at the U.S. Soccer Festival in Minnesota and was also a member for the u-17 National Team.

References

External links
 Borgman Profile
Tar Heels bio of Borgman
 http://www.soccertimes.com/usteams/roster/women/borgman.htm

1980 births
Living people
North Carolina Tar Heels women's soccer players
American women's soccer players
Parade High School All-Americans (girls' soccer)
Soccer players from Cincinnati
Women's United Soccer Association players
Carolina Courage players
San Jose CyberRays players
United States women's international soccer players
Women's association football defenders